Neptune, Neptune Calming the Waves or Irritated Neptune is a 1767 marble sculpture of Neptune by the French artist Augustin Pajou, now in the Museum of Fine Arts of Lyon. He produced a terracotta modello for the work.

Bibliography
Philippe Durey, Le Neptune d’A. Pajou et le buste du chancelier d’Aguesseau de J-B Stouf au musée des Beaux-Arts de Lyon

1767 sculptures
Marble sculptures
Pajou
Sculptures of the Museum of Fine Arts of Lyon
Seashells in art